Cesiribacter andamanensis is a Gram-negative, rod-shaped and non-motile bacterium from the genus Cesiribacter which has been isolated from soil from a mud volcano on the Andaman Islands, a Union Territory of India. The bacterium was closest to the genus Marivirga. The growth was observed at 18-37 degree Celsius but had the most growth around 30-37 degree Celsius.

References

Further reading

External links
Type strain of Cesiribacter andamanensis at BacDive -  the Bacterial Diversity Metadatabase

Cytophagia
Bacteria described in 2011